Scanel Hockey Arena (also known as Iscenter Nord) is an arena in Frederikshavn, Denmark. It is used by Frederikshavn White Hawks. The old ice rink from 1970 was demolished and in 2014 the Scanel Hockey Arena was built. It has a capacity of 4000 with 750 seats.

Indoor ice hockey venues in Denmark